The 1999 Grote Prijs Jef Scherens was the 33rd edition of the Grote Prijs Jef Scherens cycle race and was held on 5 September 1999. The race started and finished in Leuven. The race was won by Marc Streel.

General classification

References

1999
1999 in road cycling
1999 in Belgian sport
September 1999 sports events in Europe